Rubinho may refer to:
Rubens Barrichello (born 1972), nicknamed Rubinho, Brazilian Formula One racing driver
Rubinho (footballer) (born 1982), full name Rubens Fernando Moedim, Brazilian football goalkeeper